Valentin Ignatov may refer to:

 Valentin Ignatov (surgeon) (born 1958), Bulgarian surgeon
 Valentin Ignatov (footballer) (born 1966), Bulgarian football player